Cicada are a British electronic music group. Members include producers Aaron Gilbert (a.k.a. Mr. Natural), Alex Payne and several guest vocalists including Tom Smith from Editors, Heidrun Bjornsdottir, Ben Onono, Max Berlin, Bjorn from Pacific! and most recently Fleur East, Megan Quashie, Joel Pott and Shahin Badar.

Biography
They released several critically acclaimed singles throughout 2005 and 2006, including "The Things You Say" and  "Cut Right Through" (both of which Feature vocals by Geordie singer Jennifer Lamb), and "Electric Blue".  They have also done remixes for Depeche Mode, New Order, Chicane, Dannii Minogue, LeAnn Rimes, Client, Blu Mar Ten and The Veronicas, and many more.

Their debut album, Cicada, was released in summer 2006 on Critical Mass Records. Their second album Roulette, was released in 2009, and included the songs "Falling Rockets" (which is used in The Big Bang Theory), "Metropolis", "Psycho Thrills" and "One Beat Away". Cicada's third album Sunburst was released in August 2011 and includes the singles "Fast Cars", "Your Love" and "Come Together". Their song "Don't Stare At the Sun" is used in a commercial for Revlon featuring Jessica Biel.

As of June 2016, Cicada are on hiatus.

Discography

Albums and EPs
2006: Cicada
2009: Roulette
2011: Sunburst

Singles
2002: "Electric Blue"
2002: "Let Me See You"
2002: "Golden Blue"
2002: "Cut Right Through"
2003: "The Things You Say"
2006: "You Got Me Feeling"
2007: "Beautiful (Electric Blue)"
2008: "Same Old Scene"
2008: "Falling Rockets"
2009: "Metropolis"
2009: "Don't Stare at the Sun"
2009: "Psycho Thrills"
2010: "One Beat Away"
2010: "Magnetic"
2010: "Your Love"
2011: "Fast Cars"
2011: "Come Together"
2013: "Ka-Pow!"
2014: "Around and Around" (feat. Fleur)

Remixes

References

External links
 

English electronic music groups
English house music groups
Musical groups established in 2002
Musical groups from London
Remixers
Nu-disco musicians